Senecio apolobambensis is a species of Senecio in the family Asteraceae. It is native to Bolivia.

References

apolobambensis
Taxa named by Ángel Lulio Cabrera